Rudapithecus is a chimpanzee-like genus of ape which inhabited Europe during the Late Miocene, approximately 10 million years ago. One species is known, Rudapithecus hungaricus. The genus name "Rudapithecus" comes from where it was discovered, in Rudabánya, Northern Hungary in 1965 and sent to Budapest in 1967.  The specific name "hungaricus" refers to the country where it was discovered, in Hungary.

Rudapithecus probably moved among branches like modern apes do now, holding its body upright, and climbing trees with its arms. Rudapithecus hungaricus differed from modern great apes by having a more flexible lumbar, which indicates when Rudapithecus came down to the ground, it might have had the ability to stand upright like humans do. Modern Gorilla, Pan, and Pongo have a long pelvis, and a short lumbar because they are very large animals, which is why they usually walk on all fours. Humans have a longer, more flexible lumbar, which allow humans to stand upright, and walk efficiently on two legs. It is known that Rudapithecus had a more flexible torso than today's apes, because it was much smaller, about the size of a medium-sized dog.

References

Prehistoric apes
Miocene primates of Europe